Danish Irfan  is a Singaporean professional footballer currently playing as a defender for Tampines Rovers.

He captained the Singapore Under-19 side that participated at the ASEAN Football Federation (AFF) U-19 Championships.

Career statistics 
As @ 21 Sept 2019

International Statistics

U22 International caps

U19 International caps

References

Living people
Singaporean footballers
Association football midfielders
Singapore Premier League players
1999 births
Singapore youth international footballers